HMS Pelorus was a 2,330 ton displacement, 21 gun corvette launched on 5 February 1857 from the Devonport dockyard. It was captained at first by Frederick Beauchamp Paget Seymour, then by Henry Boys, and later William Henry Haswell.

She participated as part of a squadron after the Indian Rebellion of 1857. Then she was sent to the China Station during the Second Opium War until May 1859 when she sailed for Australian Station.

In June 1860, as flagship of the Australian Squadron under Captain Frederick Seymour, she participated in the attack on Puketakauere pā during the First Taranaki War. Later that year, the crew landed at Kairau to support British troops under attack from Maori and in January 1861 a gun crew from the ship helped defend the British redoubt at Huirangi against the Maori. She left the Australia Station in July 1862 for Plymouth.

The future admiral, Cyprian Bridge served on Pelorus in the East Indies as a midshipman. 

She was decommissioned in 1868 and was broken up for scrap in 1869.

Pelorus Island, a tiny island of the Palm Islands group off North Queensland, is said to be named after the ship.

References

 

 

Pearl-class corvettes
1857 ships
Ships built in Plymouth, Devon